Don Parties On is a 2011 play written by David Williamson. It was a sequel to Don's Party and opened the 2011 season of the Melbourne Theatre Company. Directed by Robyn Nevin, this sequel premiered on 13 January 2011 at the Arts Centre Melbourne Playhouse.

The same characters 40 years on plus a few new arrivals. Don is now a retired school teacher.

Plot
The Scene: 21 August 2010, Don invites old friends around for a party the night of the federal election.

It’s 21 August 2010, the night of yet another federal election and, of course, yet another election night party at Don’s place. Over the decades, as he and his friends watched governments come and go, they have also closely followed the incoming results from each other’s lives: the tallies of luck and misfortune, the unexpected swings for and against. And through it all, the lesson that this crowd of superannuated Baby Boomers never seemed to learn is that politics and strong personalities should never be mixed with alcohol.

The relationships between the returning characters have changed, and there are also new characters: Cooley's wife Helen, Don and Kath's son Richard, Richard's lover Roberta, and his daughter Belle.

Background
Williamson said he wrote the play for two reasons:
One was, what had happened to Don and his friends? The 20-somethings of Don’s Party were starting to ask themselves how their lives were going to pan out. Would their hopes and dreams be realised? Forty years later they know exactly how things have panned out – who has succeeded and who has failed and what criteria do you use to evaluate such questions in any case? Secondly, what has happened to Australia politically and socially in the intervening years? How has the landscape changed?

Cast of Original Production
 Diane Craig - Helen
 Georgia Flood - Belle
 Darren Gilshenan - Richard
 Robert Grubb - Mal
 Frankie J. Holden - Cooley
 Sue Jones - Jenny
 Garry McDonald - Don Henderson
 Tracy Mann - Kath Henderson
 Nikki Shiels - Roberta

Reception
The play received mixed reviews but proved popular.

References

External links
Review of original production at Crikey
Review of 2011 Melbourne Production at Sydney Morning Herald
Review of 2011 Melbourne production at Theatre Notes

2011 plays
Plays by David Williamson